The Vermont election in 2008 consisted of elections for federal, state, and local elections. All state offices are for two years; all terms expired in 2008. Elections included the gubernatorial, all state offices, including all state senators and representatives, the federal Congress and the presidential. There was no federal Senate seat open.

A primary election in August determined which candidates parties would choose to run in the general election in November. An earlier "primary" selected Vermont's choices for candidates for president.

Turnout
72% of the voters, 327,301, turned out for the general election. This was the highest percentage, so far, in the 21st century. A record 26% of young voters turned out.

Polls
On February 24, 2008, polls showed Sen. Barack Obama leading Sen. Hillary Clinton by an average margin of 24% (57% to 33%), with 10% Not Sure.

Democratic Party Results

Republican Party Results 

* Candidate dropped out of the race before the primary

See also
 Vermont Democratic primary, 2008
 Vermont Republican primary, 2008

References

 
Vermont